Victory Yendra (born September 10, 1989 in Kuantan Singingi Regency) is an Indonesian footballer who currently plays for PSPS Pekanbaru in the Indonesia Super League.

Club statistics

References

External links

1989 births
Association football forwards
Living people
Indonesian footballers
Liga 1 (Indonesia) players
PSPS Pekanbaru players
Persiks Kuantan Singingi players
Sportspeople from Riau